Drungtsho Karma Wangchuk is a Bhutanese politician who has been a member of the National Assembly of Bhutan, since October 2018.

Education and professional life 
He holds a Bachelor's degree in indigenous medicine. He worked as a drungtsho (traditional physician) since 1998.

Political career 
Wangchuk was elected to the National Assembly of Bhutan as a candidate of DPT from Chhumig Ura constituency in 2018 Bhutanese National Assembly election. He received 1438 votes (through postal ballot and electronic voting machines) and defeated Phuntsho Namgay, a candidate of Druk Nyamrup Tshogpa.

Following Wangchuk's successful election, DPT nominated him for the Deputy Speaker of the National Assembly of Bhutan on 30 October 2018. On 31 October 2018, he lost the office to Tshencho Wangdi.

References 

Traditional medicine practitioners

1970 births
Living people
Bhutanese MNAs 2018–2023
Druk Phuensum Tshogpa politicians
Druk Phuensum Tshogpa MNAs